Fuzhou cuisine is one of the four subsets of Fujian cuisine, which is one of the  Eight Great Traditions  of Chinese cuisine. 
Fuzhou cuisine's taste is light compared to other styles, often with a mixed sweet and sour taste. Fuzhou cuisine displays an influence from the neighboring Zhejiang province's cuisine and as the capital of Fujian, Fuzhou has been influenced more heavily by cuisines from Northern China. It is traditionally considered the most prestigious subset of Fujian cuisine and was a strong influence on Ryukyuan cuisine in Japan.

Notable Dishes 
 Ding bian hu
 Buddha jumps over the wall
 Fuzhou fish ball
 Gua bao
 Kompyang
 Hujiao bing
 Lychee pork

References 
 Fujian Cuisine and Restaurants Chinaplanner.com

Regional cuisines of China

Culture in Fujian